Maggiano's Little Italy is an American casual dining restaurant chain specializing in Italian-American cuisine. The company was founded in Chicago's River North neighborhood, at Clark Street and Grand Avenue, in 1991 by Rich Melman's Lettuce Entertain You Enterprises (LEYE), and was named after Melman's late partner, Marvin Magid. The concept was acquired by Brinker International, Inc. in August 1995 from LEYE. As of March 22, 2021, there were 54 locations throughout 22 states and the District of Columbia.

In February 2017, they introduced a seven-day-a-week brunch menu.

History
Richard Melman expanded LEYE's Italian division in 1991 with the opening of Maggiano's Little Italy in Chicago. According to the company's history, the concept aimed at "re-creating the classic pre-World War II dinner house featuring family size portions".

The first restaurant was at the corners of Clark Street and Grand Avenue in Chicago and opened November 11, 1991. A second restaurant was opened in Oak Brook, Illinois followed by one in Skokie, Illinois. In 1994, they opened their first restaurant outside of Illinois.  In 1995, Brinker International purchased the restaurant with the goal of taking it national.

See also
 List of Italian restaurants

References

External links
 

Companies based in Dallas
Restaurants established in 1991
Restaurant chains in the United States
Italian-American cuisine
Italian restaurants in the United States
1991 establishments in Illinois
1995 mergers and acquisitions